The following article features the records and statistics of Fulham Football Club, based in Fulham, West London.

Player appearances
There are five Fulham players who have been in the club's starting line-up more than 450 times, all of whom have since retired from football:
Johnny Haynes – 658
Eddie Lowe – 511
Les Barrett – 491
Frank Penn – 459
George Cohen – 459

Current
The players with the most appearances in all forms who are still at the club as of 27 October 2022 are:
Tim Ream – 255
Tom Cairney – 245
Aleksandar Mitrovic - 188
Neeskens Kebano – 142
Bobby Decordova-Reid – 126
Joe Bryan – 116

Goalscorers
Eight men have scored 100 or more goals for the club:
Gordon Davies – 178
Johnny Haynes – 158
Bedford Jezzard – 154
Jim Hammond – 150
Graham Leggat – 134
Arthur Stevens – 124
Steve Earle – 108
Aleksandar Mitrović – 106

Current
The three most prolific goalscorers currently at the club as of 20 August 2022 are:
Aleksandar Mitrović – 106
Tom Cairney - 41
Neeskens Kebano - 24

Transfers

Highest transfer fees paid

Highest transfer fees received

Player of the season
2021–22: Aleksandar Mitrović
2020–21: Alphonse Areola
2019–20: Aleksandar Mitrović
2018–19: Calum Chambers
2017–18: Tim Ream
2016–17: Tom Cairney
2015–16: Ross McCormack
2014–15: Ross McCormack
2013–14: Ashkan Dejagah
2012–13: Dimitar Berbatov
2011–12: Clint Dempsey
2010–11: Clint Dempsey
2009–10: Zoltán Gera
2008–09: Mark Schwarzer
2007–08: Simon Davies
2006–07: Brian McBride
2005–06: Brian McBride
2004–05: Luís Boa Morte

International squad players

Algeria
 Hameur Bouazza
 Rafik Halliche

Argentina
 Facundo Sava

Australia
 Mark Schwarzer
 Adrian Leijer
 Len Quested
 Ahmad Elrich
 Ryan Williams

Austria
 Michael Madl

Belgium
 Philippe Albert
 Mousa Dembélé
 Denis Odoi

Bermuda
 Kyle Lightbourne

Bulgaria
 Dimitar Berbatov

Cameroon
 Pierre Womé
 André-Frank Zambo Anguissa

Canada
 Paul Peschisolido
 Tomasz Radzinski
 Paul Stalteri

Côte d'Ivoire
 Jean Michaël Seri

Costa Rica
 Bryan Ruiz

Czech Republic
 Marcel Gecov
 Zdeněk Grygera
 Jan Laštůvka

Denmark
 Leon Andreasen
 Claus Jensen
 Bjarne Goldbæk
 Peter Møller

DR Congo
  Neeskens Kebano
  Gabriel Zakuani

England
 Alan Mullery
 Bedford Jezzard
 Bernard Joy
 Bobby Moore
 Bobby Robson
 Bobby Zamora
 George Cohen
 Stan Collymore
 Dave Beasant
 Johnny Haynes
 Zat Knight
 Malcolm Macdonald
 Paul Parker
 Rodney Marsh
 Peter Beardsley
 Andrew Cole
 Wayne Bridge
 Paul Konchesky
 Danny Murphy
 Andy Johnson
 David Stockdale
 Jim Taylor
 Tim Coleman
 Albert Barrett
 Len Oliver
 Danny Shea
 Arthur 'Pablo' Stevens
 Frank Penn
 Johnny Price
 Jim Langley
 Roy Bentley
 Eddie Lowe
 Pat Beasley
 Allan Clarke
 Robert Wilson
 Lee Clark
 Franky Osborne
 Gordon Hoare
 Arthur Berry
 Johnny 'Budgie' Byrne
 Chris Smalling
 Joe Bacuzzi
 Jim Hammond

Egypt
 Hussein Hegazi

Finland
 Jari Litmanen
 Toni Kallio
 Shefki Kuqi
 Antti Niemi
 Lauri Dalla Valle

France
 Alain Goma
 Anthony Knockaert
 Aboubakar Kamara
 Martin Djetou
 Steve Marlet
 Louis Saha
 Philippe Christanval
 Olivier Dacourt
 Sylvain Legwinski
 Maxime Le Marchand

Gabon
 Mario Lemina

Germany
 Karl-Heinz Riedle
 Moritz Volz

Ghana
 John Pantsil
 Elvis Hammond

Gibraltar
 Tony Macedo

Great Britain (at the Olympics)
 Bobby Brown

Greece
 Giorgos Karagounis
 Kostas Mitroglou

Guinea
 Ibrahima Cissé

Guinea-Bissau
 Mesca
 Marcelo Djaló

Hungary
 Zoltán Gera
 Csaba Somogyi

Iceland
 Heiðar Helguson
 Eiður Guðjohnsen
 Ragnar Sigurðsson

Iran
 Andranik Teymourian
 Ashkan Dejagah

Ireland (Eire)
 Gerry Peyton
 Jimmy Conway
 Ray Houghton
 Steve Finnan
 Stephen Kelly
 Damien Duff
 Robin Lawler
 John Dempsey
 Jimmy Dunne
 Joe Connor
 Georgie Reid
 Terry Phelan
 Cyrus Christie

Italy
  Vincenzo Montella 
  Marcello Trotta 

Japan
 Junichi Inamoto

Jamaica
 Barry Hayles
 Bobby Decordova-Reid
 Michael Hector

Latvia
 Andrejs Štolcers

Mali
 Mahamadou Diarra

Mexico
 Carlos Salcido

Morocco
 Abdeslam Ouaddou

Netherlands
 Edwin van der Sar
 Collins John
Bobby Petta 

New Zealand
 Simon Elliott

Nigeria
 Dickson Etuhu
 Sone Aluko

Northern Ireland
 Maik Taylor
 Steven Davis
 David Healy
 George Best
 Aaron Hughes
 Chris Baird
 Hugh Kelly
 Johnny Campbell

Norway
 Brede Hangeland
 Erik Nevland
 Bjørn Helge Riise
 John Arne Riise
 Stefan Johansen

Pakistan
 Zesh Rehman

Philippines
 Neil Etheridge

Portugal
 Luís Boa Morte
 Orlando Sá
 Ricardo Batista

Russia
 Alexey Smertin
 Pavel Pogrebnyak

Saint Kitts and Nevis
 Calum Willock

Scotland
 John Collins
 Graham Leggat
 Jimmy Sharp
 Ian Black
 Peter Buchanan
 Steve Archibald
 Des Bremner
 Doug Rougvie
 Gordon Boyd
 Ross McCormack
 Tom Cairney
 Kevin McDonald

Senegal
 Papa Bouba Diop
 Diomansy Kamara

Serbia
 Dejan Stefanović
 Aleksandar Mitrović

Seychelles
 Kevin Betsy

Sierra Leone
 Leroy Rosenior

Slovakia
 Marek Rodák

South Africa
 Kagisho Dikgacoi
 Andre Arendse

South Korea
 Seol Ki-hyeon

Sweden
 Fredrik Stoor
 Björn Runström
 Alexander Kačaniklić

Switzerland
 Pascal Zuberbühler
 Philippe Senderos
 Pajtim Kasami
 Kerim Frei

Togo
 Floyd Ayité

Trinidad and Tobago
 Tony Warner

United States
 Clint Dempsey
 Brian McBride
 Carlos Bocanegra
 Kasey Keller
 Tim Ream
 Marcus Hahnemann
 Emerson Hyndman
 Eddie Lewis
 Eddie Johnson
 Marlon Fossey
 Luca de la Torre
 Antonee Robinson

Uruguay
 Martín Herrera

Wales
 Andy Melville
 Chris Coleman
 Gordon Davies
 Mark Crossley
 Mark Pembridge
 Simon Davies
 Sonny Gibbon
 Kit Symons
 Paul Trollope
 Jeff Hopkins
 Alan Neilson
 'Big' Dick Richards
 Syd Thomas
 Harry Wilson

Milestones
Fulham has never won a major trophy; however, it has a number of achievements. In the list below, all trophies and leagues are referred to by the names they held at the time, which, due to commercial and practical reasons, have changed over time. For more information, see articles in individual leagues from here.

1885 – London FA Cup quarter-finalists
1886 – West London Cup winners, beating St Matthew's 2–1 in the final
1891 – West London Observer Cup winners, Billy Mugford scored a hat-trick when they beat local rivals Stanley 5–3 in a replay.
1892 – West London League champions
1892 – Middlesex Senior Cup quarter-finalists
1892 – London Senior Cup quarter-finalists
1893 – West London League champions
1893 – West London Cup runners-up
1893 – West London Observer Cup runners-up, lost 3–2 to QPR
1896 – London Senior Cup runners-up
1897–88 – London League runners-up (to Barnet F.C.)
1899–1900 – Southern League Second Division, finished runners-up to Watford F.C.
1901–02 – Southern League Second Division champions (lost Test (play-off) and was subsequently not promoted)
1902–03 – Southern League Second Division Second Division champions
1904–05 – Southern League Second Division Second Division champions
1906 – Southern League (1st Division) Champions
1907 – Southern League (1st Division) Champions
1907 – Admission to The Football League as Southern League Champions
1908 – FA Cup Semi-Finalists
1910 – London Challenge Cup winners (and 1931 and 1951)
1912 – FA Cup Quarter-Finalists
1926 – FA Cup Quarter-Finalists
1932 – Division Three South Champions
1936 – FA Cup Semi-Finalists
1939 – FA Cup Quarter-Finalists
1948 – FA Cup Quarter-Finalists
1949 – Division Two Champions
1951 – FA Cup Quarter-Finalists
1958 – FA Cup Semi-Finalists
1959 – Promotion from Division Two
1962 – FA Cup Semi-Finalists
1968 – League Cup Quarter-Finalists (highest ever finish)
1971 – Promotion from Division Three
1975 – FA Cup Finalists
1975 – Anglo-Scottish Cup Finalists
1982 – Promotion from Division Three
1997 – Promotion from Division Three
1999 – Division Two Champions
2001 – Division One Champions
2002 – FA Cup Semi-Finalists
2002 – UEFA Intertoto Cup winners
2003 – UEFA Cup 3rd round
2004 – Ninth-place finish in the Premier League
2009 – Seventh-placed finish in the Premier League; highest-ever finish, qualify for Europa League
2010 – UEFA Europa League finalists, defeating Juventus 4–1 at home en route to the final.
2011 – Eighth-place finish in the Premier League. Europa League qualification via Fair Play league
2012 – Defeated rivals Queens Park Rangers 6–0 in October with Andy Johnson scoring Fulham's first ever Premier League hat-trick. Finish in 9th.
2018 – Promotion from the EFL Championship to the Premier League via the play-offs, defeating Aston Villa 1–0 in the final at Wembley Stadium on 26 May.
2020 – Promotion from the EFL Championship to the Premier League via the play-offs, defeating Brentford 2–1 in the final at Wembley Stadium on 4th August.
2022 – EFL Championship champions, promotion to the Premier League, with Aleksandar Mitrovic scoring a record 43 goals in 43 league games, and recording 7-0 wins on three separate occasions, and two 6-2 wins within the space of a week.

Fulham in Europe

2009–10 Europa League

Group stage: final table

2011–12 Europa League

Group stage: final table

Penalty shoot-outs

References

External links
Fulham results since 1999/00, with links to scorers for each match – fulhamweb.co.uk

Records And Statistics
Records and Statistics
Fulham